Cody Claver (born 2 November 1996) is a Dutch footballer who plays for Amsterdamsche FC, as a left back.

Early and personal life
Born in The Hague, Claver is of Surinamese descent. His father is Surinamese and his mother is Dutch. His family lived in Zoetermeer. He was a childhood friend of Omar el Baad, who played with him at Cambuur and suggested he join the club. Whilst with the club the two shared a house in Leeuwarden.

Career
Claver began his career with Haaglandia, and he then spent two years at ADO Den Haag before returning to Haglandia. He also played for the youth teams of Sparta Rotterdam and SC Cambuur. He joined the Cambuur senior team for the 2017–18 season, making his professional debut in April 2018, playing as a right back rather than in his usual position of left back.

In January 2019 he moved to AFC. He stated his intention to resume studies for his HBO qualification alongside his football career.

References

1996 births
Living people
Dutch footballers
Haaglandia players
ADO Den Haag players
Sparta Rotterdam players
SC Cambuur players
Amsterdamsche FC players
Eerste Divisie players
Tweede Divisie players
Association football fullbacks
Dutch sportspeople of Surinamese descent
Footballers from The Hague